Automatic painting or automatic drawing may refer to:

 
 
 Automatic painting (robotic)

See also
 Automatic writing (disambiguation)